Nujella Halt railway station (station code:NUJ), serves the rail needs of Gudlavalleru. This railway station is administered under Vijayawada railway division of South Coast Railway Zone.

References 

Railway stations in Vijayawada railway division
Railway stations in Krishna district